Polygonum aviculare or common knotgrass is a plant related to buckwheat and dock. It is also called prostrate knotweed, birdweed, pigweed and lowgrass. It is an annual found in fields and wasteland, with white flowers from June to October. It is widespread across many countries in temperate regions, apparently native to Eurasia, naturalized in temperate parts of the Southern Hemisphere.

Description 
The leaves are hairless and short-stalked. They are longish-elliptical with short stalks and rounded bases; the upper ones are few and are linear and stalkless. The stipules are fused into a stem-enclosing, translucent sheath known as an ochrea that is membranous and silvery. The flowers are regular, green with white or pink margins. Each has five perianth segments, overlapping at the base, five to eight stamens and three fused carpels. The fruit is a dark brown, three-edged nut. The seeds need light to germinate which is why this plant appears in disturbed soil in locations where its seeds may have lain dormant for years. It is a common carrier of the parasitic pathogen powdery mildew, which can give the leaves a whitish appearance.

Subspecies 
Polygonum aviculare has a wide distribution as an arable weed and plant of fields, shingle, sand, roadsides, yards and waste places. There is much morphological variation among different populations and several different sub-species are recognized:
 Polygonum aviculare subsp. aviculare – very widespread
Polygonum aviculare subsp. boreale (Lange) Karlsson – Greenland, Labrador, Newfoundland, Scandinavia
Polygonum aviculare subsp. buxiforme (Small) Costea & Tardif – North America
 Polygonum aviculare subsp. depressum (Meisn.) Arcang. – Europe, North America
Polygonum aviculare var. fusco-ochreatum (Kom.) A.J.Li – northeastern China, Russian Far East
Polygonum aviculare subsp. neglectum (Besser) Arcangeli – Europe, North America
 Polygonum aviculare subsp. rurivagum (Jord. ex Boreau) Berher  – Europe, North America

Distribution
Widespread and common in Great Britain, Ireland, and Scandinavia.

Habitat
It is common on roadsides and arable ground in the British Isles.

Chemistry 
Polygonum aviculare contains the flavonols avicularin, myricitrin and juglanin. The flavanoids astragalin and betmidin, and the lignan aviculin have also been found. The diterpene alkaloid panicudine is another known component.

Fossil record
One fossil fruit of Polygonum aviculare has been extracted from borehole samples of the Middle Miocene fresh water deposits in Nowy Sacz Basin, West Carpathians, Poland.

Cuisine

It formed a traditional ingredient in porridge consumed by Germanic peoples of western Europe, and has been found in numerous autopsies of peat bodies, including the Tollund Man.

In Vietnam, where it is called rau đắng, it is widely used to prepare soup and hot pot, particularly in the southern region.

References

External links
photo of herbarium specimen collected in Nuevo León in Mexico in 1989
 Howard, Michael. Traditional Folk Remedies, (Century, 1987); page 162.

Medicinal plants
Flora of North America
Flora of Europe
Flora of Asia
aviculare
Plants described in 1753
Taxa named by Carl Linnaeus